The 1969–70 Los Angeles Stars season was the second and final season of the franchise in Los Angeles in the American Basketball Association (ABA). Late in February of the season, the team was 25-34 (9 games under .500), but by April 1st, they were 40-38, with two 6 game winning streaks in that span. The Stars qualified for the fourth and final playoff spot in the Western Division by one game. The team soon went on a miracle run, beating the Chaparrals and Rockets, in 6 and 5 games respectively, to advance to the ABA Finals. The dream ended there, however, as the Indiana Pacers beat them in 6 games. The team ended up playing some of their playoff games in Anaheim and Long Beach due to no one expecting (or booking days to play) the team to go that far in the playoffs. However, owner Jim Kirst had decided to cut his losses and sell the team to Colorado businessman Bill Daniels on March 5, 1970 (over a month before the playoffs) for $850,000, who moved the team to Salt Lake City, Utah on June 11th to become the Utah Stars. The next season, the team won the ABA Finals.

Roster  
 40 Andrew Anderson - Shooting guard
 20 Mack Calvin - Point guard
 55 Warren Davis - Power forward
 35 Wayne Hightower - Power forward
 54 Simmie Hill - Small forward 
 10 Mervin Jackson - Point guard 
 12 George Lehmann - Point guard 
 14 Bill McGill - Center
 44 Larry Miller - Shooting guard 
 44 Mel Peterson - Guard / Forward 
 12/54 Craig Raymond - Center
 22 Lester Selvage - Point guard 
 33 George Stone - Small forward 
 32 Bob Warlick - Shooting guard
 21 Bob Warren - Shooting guard 
 14 Trooper Washington - Power forward 
 42 Willie Wise - Power forward 
 22/55 Tom Workman - Forward / Center

Final standings

Western Division

Asterisk Denotes playoff berth

Playoffs 
Western Division Semifinals

Division Finals

ABA Finals

References

External links
 RememberTheABA.com 1969–70 regular season and playoff results
 Los Angeles page

Los Angeles Stars
Los Angeles Stars, 1969-70
Los Angeles Stars, 1969-70
Los Angeles Stars seasons